Naohiro (written: 直敬, 直宏, 直泰, 直弘, 直大, 直寛, 直裕, 尚大 or 尚弘) is a masculine Japanese given name. Notable people with the name include:

, Japanese politician
, Japanese politician
, Japanese professional wrestler
, Japanese volleyball player
, Japanese shogi player
, Japanese footballer
, Japanese footballer
, Japanese rugby union player
, Japanese daimyō
, Japanese daimyō
, Japanese daimyō
, Japanese footballer
, Japanese footballer
, Japanese footballer

Japanese masculine given names